Berlin Game is a 1983 spy novel by Len Deighton. It is the first novel in the first of three trilogies about Bernard Samson, a middle-aged and somewhat jaded intelligence officer working for the British Secret Intelligence Service (MI6). Berlin Game is part of the Game, Set and Match trilogy, being succeeded by Mexico Set and London Match, and followed by the Hook, Line and Sinker trilogy and the final Faith, Hope and Charity trilogy. Deighton's novel Winter (1987) is a prequel to the nine novels, covering the years 1900-1945 and providing the backstory to some of the characters.

Plot summary
The time is the early 1980s. A highly placed agent in East Germany codenamed "Brahms Four" wants to come to the West. Brahms Four is one of Britain's most reliable, most valuable agents behind the Iron Curtain, and that he should be urgently demanding safe passage to the West sends a ripple of panic through the SIS. Bernard Samson, a former field agent, and now working behind a London desk, is tasked to undertake the crucial rescue. After all, it was Brahms Four who had once, nearly twenty years ago, saved his life.

But even before Samson sets out on his mission, he is confronted with undeniable evidence that there is a traitor among his colleagues working for the KGB. Clearly, it is someone close to the top, close to Samson himself. It could be Dicky Cruyer, his incompetent supervisor - whom Samson despises. It could be the American Bret Rensselaer, who has built his entire career around the work of Brahms Four — and who is spending an inordinate amount of time with Samson's wife, Fiona (also an intelligence officer). It could be Frank Harrington, the 'rezident' (head) of the Berlin field unit. In fact, it could be any member of the senior staff at London Central — even the Director-General himself.

Bernard travels to East Berlin to assist the escape of Brahms Four, and decides at the last moment to send Brahms Four out in his place. His suspicions of treachery prove well-founded when he is captured and subsequently confronted by his wife, who had defected and betrayed the operation.

Adaptations
Bernard Samson was played by Ian Holm and Fiona Samson by Mel Martin in a 1988 Granada Television adaptation of the Game, Set and Match trilogy, entitled Game, Set and Match, transmitted as twelve 60 minute episodes. Filmed on location in Berlin and Mexico, the project included a large international cast with 3,000 extras and a budget of $8 million. While critically acclaimed, the ratings for the series were a disaster. It was adapted by John Howlett and directed by Ken Grieve and Patrick Lau. It has not been officially released on VHS or DVD.

Other
The novel contains an early promulgation of the myth that President John F. Kennedy's famous "Ich bin ein Berliner" remark actually translated to "I am a jam doughnut". In Berlin Game, the character Bernard Samson is told that he is berlinerisch:

In the preface to the reprint edition, Deighton notes that the novel is told in the highly subjective voice of the character of Bernard Samson, an unreliable narrator "who is inclined to complain and exaggerate so that we have to interpret the world around him". The author adds that "Readers who take Bernard’s words literally are missing a lot of the intended content".

In the prequel to the trilogy, Winter (1987), Deighton reminded his readers that the views of the characters were not necessarily those of the writer. The book's epigraph is a quote from James Jones: "...readers should remember that the opinions expressed by the characters are not necessarily those of the author..."

Trivia
In Quentin Tarantino's 1997 film Jackie Brown, Robert Forster's character, Max Cherry, can be seen reading this novel while waiting to pick up the title character from the prison.

In Arthur Penn’s film Target, Gene Hackman’s character, Walter Lloyd/Duncan (Duke) Potter, can be seen with a copy of this novel.

Notes

See also

Ich bin ein Berliner

1983 British novels
1983 debut novels
Bernard Samson novels
Novels set in Berlin
Hutchinson (publisher) books